"Moment" is a song by Belgian singer and songwriter Blanche. It was released as a digital download on 16 November 2018 by PIAS Belgium. The song was written by Ellie Delvaux, Pierre Dumoulin, Andras Vleminckx, Rich Cooper, Gilles Vogt and Liam Roth.

Background
Blanche has said that the song is about "living in the present, trying to forget about any doubts and fears you have…we have to let ourselves live. If we don't learn to enjoy the present moment, then we might regret it when it's over". She also said that the song is "for all the people who sometimes struggle to connect with the present moment, who feel like they’re looking at their lives from the outside". A music video was released on the same day and was directed by Eve Mahoney.

Track listing
Digital download
"Moment" – 3:19

Digital download – Piano Version
"Moment"  – 3:28

Charts

Release history

References

2018 songs
2018 singles
Blanche (singer) songs
Songs written by Eightysix (Andras Vleminckx)
Songs written by Pierre Dumoulin (songwriter)
Songs written by Blanche (singer)